Iolaus luculentus, the Chinese royal, is a species of lycaenid or blue butterfly found in Asia.

References

Tajuria
Butterflies of Asia
Butterflies described in 1887
Taxa named by John Henry Leech